Kui Tatk is a populated place located on the Tohono O'odham Indian Reservation in Pima County, Arizona, United States. Its name means "mesquite root" in the Tohono O'odham language. Historically it has also been known by the variant, Kvitatk. It has also incorrectly been identified as Iron Pipe (translated into the O'odham as Vainom Kug), which is the name of a village which sprang up around a steam pump built by miners about a mile away. The name, and its current spelling, was reached as a decision by the Board on Geographic Names in 1941. The original Indian settlement was abandoned in the 1850s, when its inhabitants migrated to different locations such as Gu Oidak, Pan Tak, and Gu Chuapo.

References

Populated places in Pima County, Arizona